The 2019–20 Perth Lynx season is the 34th season for the franchise in the Women's National Basketball League (WNBL).

In September 2019, it was announced that local internet providers, Pentanet, would serve as principal partners for the Perth Lynx after signing a one-year deal. Andy Stewart remains as head coach, serving his fifth season in the role.

Roster

Standings

Results

Pre-season

Regular season

Awards

In-season

Post-season

Club Awards

References

External links
Perth Lynx Official website

2019–20 WNBL season
WNBL seasons by team
2019–20 in Australian basketball
Basketball,Perth Lynx
Basketball,Perth Lynx